Amanaki Nicole (8 February 1992) is a New Zealand rugby union player.

Personal life
Nicole was educated at Burnside High School.

Career
Nicole made his international debut for New Zealand Sevens in 2018. He played for New Zealand at the 2018 Oceania Sevens Championship held in Suva, Fiji, the country of his birth. He was named in the New Zealand squad for the Rugby sevens at the 2020 Summer Olympics.

Nicole was named as a travelling reserve for the All Blacks Sevens squad for the 2022 Commonwealth Games in Birmingham. In September, He was selected for the team again for the Rugby World Cup Sevens in Cape Town. He won a silver medal after his side lost to Fiji in the gold medal final.

References 

1992 births
Living people
New Zealand rugby union players
Olympic rugby sevens players of New Zealand
Rugby sevens players at the 2020 Summer Olympics
Olympic medalists in rugby sevens
Olympic silver medalists for New Zealand
Medalists at the 2020 Summer Olympics
People educated at Burnside High School
Rugby union wings
Southland rugby union players